Natalia Vikhlyantseva was the defending champion, but chose not to participate.

Belinda Bencic won the title, defeating Dayana Yastremska in the final, 6–2, 6–3.

Seeds

Draw

Finals

Top half

Bottom half

References
Main Draw

Neva Cup - Singles